XHJUB-TDT (physical channel 33, virtual channel 56) is a Ciudad Juárez television station owned and operated by Televisa. The station carries the Canal 5 network. The station also airs NU9VE on channel 10.1 because channel 9 would conflict with KTSM-TV.

History

1991-2007: As Televisa's local TV station for Juárez 
The concession for XHJUB-TV was originally awarded on November 13, 1989, to Radiotelevisión del Rio Bravo, S.A. de C.V. The original concession specified that the station would operate on channel 62; however, this was changed before the station's sign-on to put XHJUB on channel 56.

When XHJUB signed on it was made into Televisa's local independent station for the Ciudad Juárez market. XEPM-TV became a relayer of the Canal de las Estrellas network, and channel 56 picked up its local newscasts and programming, competing against Televisa-affiliated independent XEJ-TV and rival then-Telemundo outlet XHIJ-TV. The local newscast went by several names including Notivisa and Noticiero 56.

Between 1991 and the launch of XHJCI-TV in 1994, the station also aired Canal 5 programming.

2007-present: Canal 5 relayer 
On July 30, 2007, Televisa Juárez announced that their stations would exchange programs. XHJCI became the Canal de las Estrellas outlet, XHJUB took on Canal 5, and XEPM became the local station for Televisa in the market.

As the Canal 5 station, XHJUB assumed virtual channel 5 on October 25, 2016. XEJ, the traditional channel 5 in Juárez, moved its virtual channel to its then-physical channel of 50.

Digital television
XHJUB-TDT began broadcasting in digital on October 12, 2012, two years after receiving initial approval. The digital signal remained after Juárez converted to digital on July 14, 2015.

On October 2, 2019, the IFT authorized the addition of Nu9ve to XHJUB as a second subchannel, using virtual channel 10 (9 is not available in Juárez because of KTSM-TV El Paso). Nu9ve programming had been airing on affiliated station XEJ-TDT.

Repeater
In 2018, Televisa was approved to establish a repeater (679 watts ERP) of XHJUB located atop Cerro Bola, in order to serve Col. Villa Esperanza, a community on the southwest edge of Ciudad Juárez which is shaded from Cerro Juárez by Cerro Bola and other mountains.

References 

Canal 5 (Mexico) transmitters
Television channels and stations established in 1991
HJUB-TDT
1991 establishments in Mexico